Legahi (also Romanized as Legāhī and Lagāhī; also known as Lyakyagi and Nakāhī) is a village in Qareh Poshtelu-e Bala Rural District, Qareh Poshtelu District, Zanjan County, Zanjan Province, Iran. At the 2006 census, its population was 384, in 80 families.

References 

Populated places in Zanjan County